Ndurutu is a settlement/municipality in Kenya's Central Province, located at 0°21'0"S, 36°37'30"E.

References 

Populated places in Central Province (Kenya)